PAR-CLIP  (photoactivatable ribonucleoside-enhanced crosslinking and immunoprecipitation) is a biochemical method for identifying the binding sites of cellular RNA-binding proteins (RBPs) and microRNA-containing ribonucleoprotein complexes (miRNPs). The method relies on the incorporation of ribonucleoside analogs that are photoreactive, such as 4-thiouridine (4-SU) and 6-thioguanosine (6-SG), into nascent RNA transcripts by living cells. Irradiation of the cells by ultraviolet light of 365 nm wavelength induces efficient crosslinking of photoreactive nucleoside–labeled cellular RNAs to interacting RBPs. Immunoprecipitation of the RBP of interest is followed by isolation of the crosslinked and coimmunoprecipitated RNA. The isolated RNA is converted into a cDNA library and is deep sequenced using next-generation sequencing technology.

Recently, PAR-CLIP have been applied to determine the transcriptome-wide binding sites of several known RBPs and microRNA-containing ribonucleoprotein complexes at high resolution.

Similar methods
CLIP-Seq, a similar method for identifying the binding sites of cellular RNA-binding proteins (RBPs)  or RNA modification sites  using UV light to cross-link RNA to RBPs without the incorporation of photoactivatable groups into RNA.

References

External links 
 starBase database: decoding miRNA-mRNA, miRNA-lncRNA, miRNA-sncRNA, miRNA-circRNA, miRNA-pseudogene, protein-lncRNA, protein-ncRNA interactions and ceRNA networks from PAR-CLIP(CLIP-Seq, HITS-CLIP,iCLIP) data, and TargetScan, PicTar, RNA22, miRanda and PITA microRNA target sites.
 BIMSB doRiNA database: a database for exploring protein-RNA, microRNA-target interactions from PAR-CLIP,CLIP-Seq, HITS-CLIP,iCLIP data, and PICTAR microRNA target site predictions.
 miRTarCLIP: A computational approach for identifying microRNA-target interactions using high-throughput CLIP and PAR-CLIP sequencing.
 dCLIP: dCLIP is a Perl program for discovering differential binding regions in two comparative CLIP-Seq (HITS-CLIP, PAR-CLIP or iCLIP) experiments.
 PARalyzer: PARalyzer is an algorithm that generates a high resolution map of interaction sites between RNA-binding proteins and their targets. The algorithm utilizes the deep sequencing reads generated from PAR-CLIP experiments.

Biochemistry detection methods
Genetics techniques
Protein methods
RNA